The 2014–15 World Rugby Women's Sevens Series was the third edition of the World Rugby Women's Sevens Series (formerly the IRB Women's Sevens World Series), an annual series of tournaments organised by World Rugby for women's national teams in rugby sevens. The series also doubled as an Olympic qualifier for the first time ever.

For the second time in the series' history, the number of events increased. The first series in 2012–13 featured four events. The 2013–14 series was initially announced with six events, but only five were actually scheduled and played. This season's series included six events.

As in previous seasons, the number of teams in each of the events was set at 12; however, the number of core teams that participate in all series events increased to 11.

Also for the first time, the women's series held a core team qualifying tournament at Hong Kong, similar to that held in the men's HSBC Sevens World Series.

The competition
As in the case of the men's counterpart, the series winner was the team that collected the most points throughout the season, based on individual tournament finishes.

The number of "core teams" that participate in all series events increased to 11 for the 2014–15 series, up from six in the inaugural 2012–13 series and nine in 2013–14. The top seven finishers in the 2013–14 series were granted core team status for 2014–15:
 
 
 
 
 
 
 

Four more core teams were determined in a qualifying tournament:

Events

Qualifying tournament 
The core team qualifying tournament was held at Shek Kip Mei Stadium in Hong Kong on 12–13 September 2014.

The qualifier began with a single round-robin pool stage, with teams divided into three four-team pools. The top two teams from each pool, plus the top two third-place finishers, advanced to a knockout stage. The four quarterfinal winners qualified as core teams for 2014–15.

  (qualified)
  (qualified)
  (qualified)
  (qualified)

Points schedule
The season championship will be determined by points earned in each tournament. The scoring system is the same used in the previous year's series.

Cup Winner - 20
Cup Runner Up - 18
3rd Place - 16
Cup Semi Finalist - 14
Plate Winner - 12
Plate Runner Up - 10
Winner 7th/8th play-off - 8
Loser 7th/8th play-off - 6
Bowl Winner - 4
Bowl Runner Up - 3
Winner 11th/12th play-off - 2
Loser 11th/12th play-off - 1

Table
Final standings for the 2014–15 series:

{| class="wikitable" style="font-size:92%;"
|-
!style="border-right:0px;" width:15px;"| 
!style="border-left:0px;"| Legend
|-
|bgcolor=ccffcc style="border-left:3px solid navy;" width:15px;"|
|Qualified as a core team for women's rugby sevens World Series IV and the 2016 Summer Olympics
|- 
|bgcolor=ccffcc|
|Qualified as a core team for women's rugby sevens World Series IV
|-
|
|Did not directly qualify for women's rugby sevens World Series IV
|}

 By agreement between the three unions on the island of Great Britain (England, Scotland, Wales), England, as highest finisher among those nations in the 2013–14 series, represents Great Britain for the purposes of Olympic qualification.

Tournaments

Dubai

São Paulo

Atlanta

Victoria

London

Amsterdam

References

External links
 

 
2014
2014 rugby sevens competitions
2015 rugby sevens competitions
2014 in women's rugby union
2015 in women's rugby union